Daniel Louw is a paralympic athlete from South Africa competing mainly in category T46 sprint events.

Louw competed in the 1996 Summer Paralympics in Atlanta.  He competed in all three sprints winning a bronze medal in the 200m and finishing fifth in both the 100m and 400m.

References

External links
 

Paralympic athletes of South Africa
Athletes (track and field) at the 1996 Summer Paralympics
Paralympic bronze medalists for South Africa
Living people
Medalists at the 1996 Summer Paralympics
Year of birth missing (living people)
Paralympic medalists in athletics (track and field)
South African male sprinters
20th-century South African people
Sprinters with limb difference
Paralympic sprinters